Suzanne Norton Jones was one of America’s influential trainers, breeders and judges in the equestrian community.  She won first place at Madison Square Garden in jumping in the Professional Horsemen Stake. She was on the cover of the New Mexico Magazine in 1946 and was named as a member of the United States Olympic Equestrian team.  She was a horse breeder and received the Association’s 30-year continuous breeder award with her husband, R. C. “Punch” Jones.  She became a 4-H judge and clinician in New Mexico and was involved with the New Mexico 4-H Horse School, which was renamed the Suzanne Norton Jones 4-H Horse School in 1992.  She was inducted into the National Cowgirl Museum and Hall of Fame in 1999 and into the American Quarter Horse Hall of Fame. She was also inducted into the Ruidoso Downs Racehorse Hall of Fame in 2014. She is the author of eight books including the book The Art of Western Riding  and many magazine articles.

References 

Living people
Horse breeders
Year of birth missing (living people)